Steven Rupprich (born April 15, 1989) is a German professional ice hockey player. He is currently playing for Dresdner Eislöwen in DEL2, the second tier league in Germany. He joined the Eislowen from the Thomas Sabo Ice Tigers in the Deutsche Eishockey Liga (DEL).

References

External links

1989 births
Living people
Dresdner Eislöwen players
German ice hockey left wingers
Ice hockey people from Berlin
Iserlohn Roosters players
Thomas Sabo Ice Tigers players